Croatisation or Croatization (or pohrvaćenje; ;  / hrvatizacija or похрваћење / pohrvaćenje) is a process of cultural assimilation, and its consequences, in which people or lands ethnically only partially Croatian or non-Croatian become Croatian.

Croatisation of Serbs

Religion 
Serbs in the Roman Catholic Croatian Military Frontier were out of the jurisdiction of the Serbian Patriarchate of Peć and in 1611, after demands from the community, the Pope established the Eparchy of Marča (Vratanija) with its seat at the Serbian-built Marča Monastery. He instated a Byzantine vicar as bishop, sub-ordinate to the Roman Catholic bishop of Zagreb, working to bring Serbian Orthodox Christians into communion with Rome which caused a struggle of power between the Catholics and the Serbs over the region. In 1695, the Serbian Orthodox Eparchy of Lika-Krbava and Zrinopolje was established by metropolitan Atanasije Ljubojevic and certified by Emperor Joseph I in 1707. In 1735, Orthodox Serbs protested in the Marča Monastery and it then became a part of the Serbian Orthodox Church until 1753 when the Pope restored the Roman Catholic clergy. On June 17, 1777, the Eparchy of Križevci was permanently established by Pope Pius VI with its see at Križevci, near Zagreb, thus forming the Croatian Greek Catholic Church which would after World War I include other people; Rusyns and Ukrainians of Yugoslavia.

Croatisation of Italians in Dalmatia 
Even with a predominant Croatian majority, Dalmatia retained relatively large Italian communities in the coast (Italian majority in some cities and islands, largest concentration in Istria). Many Dalmatian Italians looked with sympathy towards the Risorgimento movement that fought for the unification of Italy. However, after 1866, when the Veneto and Friuli regions were ceded by the Austrians to the newly formed Kingdom Italy, Dalmatia remained part of the Austro-Hungarian Empire, together with other Italian-speaking areas on the eastern Adriatic. This triggered the gradual rise of Italian irredentism among many Italians in Dalmatia, who demanded the unification of the Austrian Littoral, Fiume and Dalmatia with Italy. The Italians in Dalmatia supported the Italian Risorgimento: as a consequence, the Austrians saw the Italians as enemies and favored the Croatian communities of Dalmatia.

During the meeting of the Council of Ministers of 12 November 1866, Emperor Franz Joseph I of Austria outlined a wide-ranging project aimed at the Germanization or Slavization of the areas of the empire with an Italian presence:

Dalmatia, especially its  maritime cities, once had a substantial local Italian-speaking population (Dalmatian Italians), making up 33% of the total population of Dalmatia in 1803, but this was reduced to 20% in 1816. According to Austrian censuses, the Italian speakers in Dalmatia formed 12.5% of the population in 1865, but this was reduced to 2.8% in 1910. 

There are several reasons for the decrease of the Dalmatian Italian population following the rise of European nationalism in the 19th century:
 The conflict with the Austrian rulers caused by the Italian "Risorgimento".
 The emergence of Croatian nationalism and Italian irredentism (see Risorgimento), and the subsequent conflict of the two.
 The emigration of many Dalmatians toward the growing industrial regions of northern Italy before World War I and North and South America.
 Multi generational assimilation of anyone who married out of their social class and/or nationality – as perpetuated by similarities in education, religion, dual linguistic distribution, mainstream culture and economical output.

In 1909 the Italian language lost its status as the official language of Dalmatia in favor of Croatian only (previously both languages were recognized): thus Italian could no longer be used in the public and administrative sphere. After the World War I, Dalmatia was annexed to Kingdom of Yugoslavia, and the Italian community was granted minority rights; during the Italian occupation of Dalmatia in World War II, it was caught in the ethnic violence towards non-Italians during fascist repression. What remained of the Italian community in Dalmatia fled the area after World War II during the Istrian–Dalmatian exodus: from 1947, after the war, Dalmatian Italians were subject by Yugoslav authorities to forms of intimidation, such as nationalization, expropriation, and discriminatory taxation, which gave them little option other than emigration.

Croatisation in Bosnia and Herzegovina

19th century

During the 19th century, with the emergence of ideologies and active political engagements on introduction of ethno-national identity and nationhood among South Slavs, strong pressure was exerted on Bosnia and Herzegovina's diverse religious communities from outside forces, mainly from Serbia and Croatia. At the time, this pressure provoked some resistance, especially among Bosnian Franciscans, some of whom fiercely advocated against imminent Croatisation of Bosnian Catholics on one side, as well as imminent Serbianisation of Bosnian Orthodox people on the other, as prominent friar and historian, Antun Knežević, called them in his works, Catholic Bosniaks and Orthodox Bosniaks. Knežević's position and doctrine was that all Bosnians or Bosniaks are one people of three faiths, and that up to late 19th century, Croatian identity (and/or Serbian for that matter) never existed in Bosnia and Herzegovina. Although Fra Antun Knežević was not a unique phenomenon in this sense, he was certainly among the most articulate ones, and along with Fra. Ivan Franjo Jukić, who was his teacher and mentor earlier in his life and from whom he learned and adopted ideas, championed the notion that Catholics, Orthodox and Muslims are one nation and Bosnia and Herzegovina the country with deep cultural and historical roots. These two had the strongest impact and left the deepest mark on Bosnian culture and history, albeit insufficient to eventually halt the process. Even earlier, since at least the 17th century, many other members of the Franciscan order in Bosnia were developing and adopting the idea of a Bosniak identity regardless of religion, nurturing it within the brotherhood and carrying it over into 18th and 19th century.

Meanwhile, contemporary scholars saw Croatisation as a long lasting process of influencing and changing historical memory, through various methods and strategies. Dubravko Lovrenović, for instance, saw it as influencing a reception and interpretation of Bosnian medieval times, underlining its contemporary usage via revision and re-interpretation, in forms spanning from historical mythmaking by domestic and especially neighboring ethno-nationalist, to identity and culture politics, often based on fringe science and public demagoguery of academic elite, with language and material heritage in its midst.

Late 20th century

Following the establishment of the Croatian Republic of Herzeg-Bosnia in November 1991, and especially from May 1992 forward, the Herzeg-Bosnia leadership engaged in continuing and coordinated efforts to dominate and "Croatise" (or ethnically cleanse) the municipalities which they claimed were part of Herzeg-Bosnia, with increasing persecution and discrimination directed against the Bosniak population. The Croatian Defence Council (HVO), the military formation of Croats, took control of many municipal governments and services, removing or marginalising local Bosniak leaders. Herzeg-Bosnia authorities and Croat military forces took control of the media and imposed Croatian ideas and propaganda. Croatian symbols and currency were introduced, and Croatian curricula and the Croatian language were introduced in schools. Many Bosniaks were removed from positions in government and private business; humanitarian aid was managed and distributed to the Bosniaks' disadvantage; and Bosniaks in general were increasingly harassed. Many of them were deported to concentration camps: Heliodrom, Dretelj, Gabela, Vojno, and Šunje.

Following the breakup of Yugoslavia, the official language Serbo-Croatian broke up into separate official languages and the process in relation to Croatian involved the Croatisation of its lexicon.

Croatisation in the NDH

The Croatisation during Independent State of Croatia (NDH) was aimed primarily towards Serbs, and to a lesser degree and towards Italians, Jews and Roma. The Ustaše aim was a "pure Croatia" and the biggest enemy was the ethnic Serb population of Croatia, Bosnia and Herzegovina. The ministers of NDH announced the goals and strategies of the Ustaše in May 1941. The same statements and similar or related ones were also repeated in public speeches by single ministers, such as Mile Budak in Gospić and, a month later, by Mladen Lorković.

One third of the Serbs (in the Independent State of Croatia) were to be forcibly converted to Catholicism
One third of the Serbs were to be expelled (ethnically cleansed)
One third of the Serbs were to be killed

A Croatian Orthodox Church was established in order to try and pacify the state as well as to Croatisize the remaining Serb population once the Ustaše realized that the complete eradication of Serbs in the NDH was unattainable.

Notable individuals who voluntarily Croatised 
Dimitrija Demeter, a playwright who was the author of the first modern Croatian drama, was from a Greek family.
Vatroslav Lisinski, a composer, was originally named Ignaz Fuchs. His Croatian name is a literal translation.
Bogoslav Šulek, a lexicographer and inventor of many Croatian scientific terms, was originally Bohuslav Šulek from Slovakia.
Stanko Vraz, a poet and the first professional writer in Croatia, was originally Jakob Frass from Slovenia.
August Šenoa, a Croatian novelist, poet and writer, is of Czech-Slovak descent. His parents never learned the Croatian language, even when they lived in Zagreb.
Dragutin Gorjanović-Kramberger, a geologist, palaeontologist and archaeologist who discovered Krapina man (Krapinski pračovjek), was of German descent. He added his second name, Gorjanović, to be adopted as a Croatian.
Slavoljub Eduard Penkala was an inventor of Dutch/Polish origins. He added the name Slavoljub in order to Croatise.
Lovro Monti, Croatian politician, mayor of Knin. One of the leaders of the Croatian national movement in Dalmatia, he was of Italian roots.
Adolfo Veber Tkalčević -linguist of German descent
Ivan Zajc (born Giovanni von Seitz) a music composer was of German descent
Josip Frank, nationalist Croatian 19th century politician, born as a Jew
Vladko Maček, Croatian politician, leader of the Croats in the Kingdom of Yugoslavia after Stjepan Radić and one time opposition reformist, maker of the Cvetković-Maček agreement that founded the Croatian Banate, born in a Slovene-Czech family

Other 
Notable individuals, of Croatian origin, partially Magyarized through intermarriages and then Croatized again, include families:
Keglević
Pejačević (Pejasevich)
Ladislav Pejačević
Teodor Pejačević
Dora Pejačević
George Martinuzzi

See also 
 Istrian–Dalmatian exodus
 Dalmatian Italians
 Istrian Italians
 Serbs in Croatia
 Independent State of Croatia
 Ustaše

Notes

External links 
 http://www.tlfq.ulaval.ca/AXL/europe/croatiepolcroa.htm
 http://www.serbianunity.net/culture/library/genocide/k3.htm
 http://www.aimpress.ch/dyn/trae/archive/data/199809/80930-018-trae-zag.htm
 http://www.southeasteurope.org/subpage.php?sub_site=2&id=16431&head=if&site=4
 http://www.nouvelle-europe.eu/index.php?option=com_content&task=view&id=172&Itemid=
 http://hrcak.srce.hr/index.php?show=clanak&id_clanak_jezik=18696
 http://www.gimnazija.hr/?200_godina_gimnazije:OD_1897._DO_1921.
 https://web.archive.org/web/20080328060638/http://www.hdpz.htnet.hr/broj186/jonjic2.htm

Social history of Croatia
Cultural assimilation
Slavicization